Appleyard is an English surname. Notable people with the surname include:

 Bill Appleyard (1878–1958), English footballer
 Bob Appleyard (1924–2015), cricketer
 Bryan Appleyard, journalist and author
 David Appleyard, Reader in the Languages of the Horn of Africa at the School of Oriental and African Studies at the University of London
 Donald Appleyard, (1928–1982), Professor of Urban Design at the University of California
 E. T. S. Appleyard, (1904–1939), British physicist
 Francis Appleyard, English cricketer
 Fred Appleyard, British landscape artist
 Fred Appleyard (footballer) (1909–1995), English footballer
 Major Frederick Ernest Appleyard, British Army commander
 Major John Geoffrey Appleyard, British Special Air Service officer
 George Appleyard, English footballer
 Gertrude Appleyard, British archer
 Ian Appleyard, British alpine skier, rally driver and ornithologist
 José Luis Appleyard, Paraguayan poet
 John Appleyard, English cricketer
 John Wormald Appleyard (1831–1894) English woodcarver and sculptor
 Sir Leonard Appleyard (1938–2020), British diplomat
 Mark Appleyard, Canadian skateboarder
 Sir Matthew Appleyard (c. 1607–1670), MP for Hedon 1661–70
 Matthew Appleyard (died 1700) (c. 1660–1700), MP for Hedon 1689–95
 Peter Appleyard, Canadian jazz vibraphonist
 Rob Appleyard, Welsh rugby union player
 Robin Appleyard, 125cc Grand Prix motorcycle racer (1983–96)
 William Appleyard (rugby league), rugby league player

See also 

 Appleyard (Greencastle, Indiana), a historic district near Greencastle, Indiana
 Silver Appleyard Duck, a breed of domestic duck
 The Appleyards, a British television soap opera for children

References 

English-language surnames